Leucorrhinia is a genus of dragonfly in the family Libellulidae. They are commonly called whitefaces because of their distinctive pale frons.

Species
Listed alphabetically.

References

External links

 Whitefaces, PBase
 Whitefaces, BugGuide

Libellulidae
Anisoptera genera
Taxa named by Christian Casimir Brittinger
Taxonomy articles created by Polbot